Let Them Live is a 1937 American drama film directed by Harold Young and written by Lionel Houser and Bruce Manning. The film stars John Howard, Nan Grey, Edward Ellis, Judith Barrett, Robert Wilcox and Benny Bartlett. The film was released on April 25, 1937, by Universal Pictures.

Plot

Cast       
John Howard as Dr. Paul Martin
Nan Grey as Judith Marshall
Edward Ellis as Pete Lindsey
Judith Barrett as Rita Johnson
Robert Wilcox as Dr. Donald Clipton
Benny Bartlett as Mike
Henry Kolker as Judge Lederer
Robert Warwick as The Mayor
William B. Davidson as The Editor
Ralph Remley as Danny

References

External links
 

1937 films
American drama films
1937 drama films
Universal Pictures films
Films directed by Harold Young (director)
American black-and-white films
1930s English-language films
1930s American films